Fridolf Stands Up! (Swedish: Fridolf sticker opp!) is a 1958 Swedish comedy film directed by Torgny Anderberg and starring Douglas Håge, Hjördis Petterson and Lars Ekborg. The film's sets were designed by the art director Bibi Lindström. It was one of a series of films featuring Håge as Fridolf Olsson.

Cast
 Douglas Håge as Fridolf Olsson
 Hjördis Petterson as Selma Olsson
 Lars Ekborg as Valdemar Palm
 Inga Gill as Maggan Palm
 Karl-Arne Holmsten as Egon Lönn
 Mona Malm as Lisa Dahlman
 Jan Molander as Grillhagen
 Olle Hilding as Nilsson
 Kotti Chave as Skarvik
 Bo Thörner as Lillen
 Hans Strååt as Fridh
 Ivar Wahlgren as Gustavsson
 Emy Hagman as Selma's Friend
 Olof Thunberg as Driving Instructor
 Arthur Fischer as Manager
 Sten Lindgren as Government Official
 Astrid Bodin as Woman at Kvinnogillet Dinner 
 Birger Lensander as Man at Fountain

References

Bibliography 
 Krawc, Alfred. International Directory of Cinematographers, Set- and Costume Designers in Film: Denmark, Finland, Norway, Sweden (from the beginnings to 1984). Saur, 1986.

External links 
 

1958 films
Swedish comedy films
1958 comedy films
1950s Swedish-language films
Films directed by Torgny Anderberg
1950s Swedish films